The Roxy Performances is a box set by Frank Zappa. It was released as a 7-CD boxset on February 2, 2018. The collection contains four full shows, a rehearsal, a recording session at Bolic Sound, a sound check, and a previously unreleased version of "The Idiot Bastard Son" titled "That Arrogant Dick Nixon".

In addition to previously unreleased material, the box set contains material that was released, in different edits and/or mixes, on Roxy & Elsewhere (1974), Roxy by Proxy (2014), and Roxy – The Movie / Roxy the Soundtrack (2015).

Track listing (digital version)

 Tracks 1–4: 12-10-73 Roxy rehearsal
 Track 5: basic tracks: 12-9-73 Show 1, overdubs at Paramount Studios
 Tracks 6–14: 12-12-73 Bolic Studios recording session

Track listing (CD version)

Disc one
 Tracks 1–14: 12-9-73 Show 1 (tracks 1–14)
 Total length: 76:43

Disc two
 Track 1: 12-9-73 Show 1 (track 15)
 Tracks 2–9: 12-9-73 Show 2 (tracks 1–8)
 Total length: 58:25

Disc three
 Tracks 1–3: 12-9-73 Show 2  (tracks 9-11)
 Tracks 4–8: 12-10-73 Show 1 (tracks 1–4)
 Total length: 74:57

Disc four
 Tracks 1–11: 12-10-73 Show 1 (tracks 5–16)
 Tracks 2–17: 12-10-73 Show 2 (tracks 1–6)
 Total length: 67:50

Disc five
 Tracks 1–11 12-10-73 Show 2 (tracks 7–17)
 Total length: 62:46

Disc six
 Tracks 1: 12-10-73 Show 2 (tracks 18)
 Tracks 2–15: Bonus Section 1 (tracks 1–14)
 Total length: 70:31

Disc seven
 Tracks 1–10: Bonus Section 2: 12-8-73 Sound Check/Film Shoot (tracks 1–10)
 Total length: 64:41

Personnel

Musicians
 Frank Zappa – lead guitar, vocals, original producer
 George Duke – keyboards, synthesizer, vocals
 Tom Fowler – bass
 Ruth Underwood – percussion
 
 Bruce Fowler – trombone, dancing (?)
 Napoleon Murphy Brock – tenor sax, flute, lead vocals
 Ralph Humphrey – drums, percussion
 Chester Thompson – drums, percussion

Also featuring
 Jeff Simmons – dialog on "Dummy Up"
 Pamela Des Barres – dancing
 Carl Franzoni – dancing
 Brenda – dancing

Technical personnel
 Kerry McNabb – recording engineer at The Roxy shows and "That Arrogant Dick Nixon"
 Bob Hughes – recording engineer at Bolic Studios
 Doug Graves – recording engineer at Bolic Studios
 Craig Parker Adams – audio restoration, re-mix, mastering
 Bob Stone – digital re-mix engineer (Bolic Studios)
 Ahmet Zappa – producer for release
 Joe Travers – producer for release, liner notes
 Jen Jewel Brown – liner notes
 Dave Alvin – liner notes

References 

Frank Zappa live albums
Frank Zappa compilation albums
2018 compilation albums